The rowing competitions at the 2020 Summer Olympics in Tokyo took place between 23 and 30 July 2021 at the Sea Forest Waterway (Central Breakwater) in Tokyo Bay. Fourteen medal events were contested by 526 athletes (263 men and women each).

Competition format 
The rowing programme featured a total of fourteen events, seven each for both men and women in identical boat classes. This gender equality was suggested by the World Rowing Federation at its February 2017 congress, with the recommendation adopted by the International Olympic Committee in June 2017. This balancing was achieved by deleting the men's lightweight four and adding the women's coxless four boat classes. The women's coxless four previously ran at the 1992 Barcelona Olympics; the only time this boat class was an Olympic event. The changes to the Olympic rowing schedule were the first since the 1996 Atlanta Olympics.

Events for the 2020 Tokyo Olympics included both disciplines of rowing: sweep rowing, where competitors each use a single oar, and sculling, where they use two placed on opposite sides of the boat. There was also one lightweight (weight restricted) event for each gender: the lightweight double sculls. Sculling events include men's and women's singles, doubles, lightweight doubles, and quads. Sweep events included men's and women's coxless pairs, coxless fours, and eights.

Regatta venue

The event took at the Sea Forest Waterway, a new venue constructed specifically for the 2020 Summer Olympic Games and Paralympic Games. The water is about 6 metres deep. The course is 2335 meters long and 198 meters wide. Each lane is 12.5 m wide. There were 8 lanes.

Qualification

A total of 526 quota spots were available. Each qualified nation entered one boat for each of the fourteen events. The majority of the berths were awarded based on the results at the 2019 World Rowing Championships, held in Ottensheim, Austria from 25 August to 1 September 2019. Places were awarded to National Olympic Committees, not to specific athletes, finishing in the top 9 in the single sculls (both men and women), top 5 in the eights, top 8 in the fours and quadruple sculls, top 7 in the lightweight double sculls, and top 11 each in the pairs and double sculls. Further berths were distributed to the nations (and in this case to specific competitors) at four continental qualifying regattas in Asia and Oceania, Africa, Latin America, and Europe, and at a final Olympic qualification regatta in Lucerne, Switzerland.

Competition schedule

On 23 July, World Rowing announced changes to the schedule due to forecasted inclement weather for 26 July. All racing originally scheduled for 26 July was moved to 25 July. The eights heats were also moved from 25 to 24 July to accommodate the new schedule.  Further revisions were made on 25 July, cancelling racing on 27 July due to Tropical Storm Nepartak hitting parts of Japan.

Participation

Events by number of boats entered
Each event has the same number of boats entered for men and women.

Participating nations (number of rowers)

Medalists

Medal table

Men’s

Women’s

Records

See also
Rowing at the 2020 Summer Paralympics

References
Notes

Citations

External links

 Results book 

 
2020
2020 Summer Olympics events
Rowing competitions in Japan
2021 in rowing